İlxıçılar (also, Ilxıçılar and Ilkhychylar) is a village in the Tartar Rayon of Azerbaijan.  The village forms part of the municipality of Azad Qaraqoyunlu.

References 

Populated places in Tartar District